Spessa is a comune (municipality) in the Province of Pavia in the Italian region Lombardy, which is located  about 40 km southeast of Milan and about 15 km southeast of Pavia. As of 31 December 2004, it had a population of 545 and an area of 12.2 km².

Spessa borders the following municipalities: Arena Po, Belgioioso, Costa de' Nobili, Portalbera, San Cipriano Po, San Zenone al Po, Stradella, Torre de' Negri.

Demographic evolution

References

Cities and towns in Lombardy